Aviram Rubinstein is a former Israeli footballer who played in Maccabi Netanya.

He is the son of Yanek Rubinstein, also a former footballer who played in Netanya.

Honours
Israeli Second Division (1):
1998-99

References

1980 births
Living people
Israeli Jews
Israeli footballers
Maccabi Netanya F.C. players
Hapoel Ra'anana A.F.C. players
Hapoel Hod HaSharon F.C. players
Maccabi Ironi Kfar Yona F.C. players
Hapoel Pardesiya F.C. players
Israeli Premier League players
Liga Leumit players
Footballers from Netanya
Association football forwards